Old City Hall may refer to:

Asia
In Hong Kong
 Old City Hall (Hong Kong)

Europe
In Croatia
Old City Hall (Zagreb)

In Denmark
 Old City Hall (1479–1728), in Copenhagen
 Old City Hall (1728–1795), in Copenhagen
 Old City Hall (Aalborg)
 Old City Hall (Aarhus)

In Germany
Old City Hall (Berlin)

In the Netherlands
Old City Hall (The Hague)

North America
In Canada
Old City Hall (Guelph)
Old City Hall (Ottawa)
Old City Hall (Toronto)

In the United States
Old City Hall (Mobile, Alabama)
Old City Hall (Fairbanks, Alaska)
Old City Hall (Gilroy, California), listed on the NRHP in Santa Clara County, California
District of Columbia City Hall, Washington, D.C., also known as Old City Hall
Old City Hall (Boca Raton, Florida)
Old City Hall (Crystal River, Florida)
Old City Hall (Fort Wayne, Indiana)
Old City Hall (Davenport, Iowa)
Old City Hall and Engine House, Annapolis, Maryland
Old City Hall (Boston), Massachusetts
Old City Hall (St. Charles, Missouri)
Old City Hall (Omaha, Nebraska)
Old City Hall (Elyria, Ohio), listed on the NRHP in Lorain County, Ohio
Old City Hall (Bradford, Pennsylvania)
Old City Hall (Lancaster, Pennsylvania)
Old City Hall (Philadelphia), Pennsylvania
Old City Hall (Williamsport, Pennsylvania)
Old City Hall (Knoxville), Tennessee
Old City Hall (Richmond, Virginia)
Old City Hall (Bellingham, Washington), now the Whatcom Museum of History and Art
Old City Hall (Tacoma, Washington)

See also
 Old Town Hall (disambiguation)
Old Government House (disambiguation)

Architectural disambiguation pages